Elections for the North Tyneside Metropolitan Council took place on 3 May 2012.

North Tyneside Council is elected in thirds, which means one councillor from each three-member ward is elected each year except for every fourth year, when the mayoral election takes place.

One third of the councillors were elected in 2008.

Resulting Political Composition

Between October 2012 and November 2013, a Liberal Democrat candidate won a by-election and a Labour Councillor became Independent. The Council composition was therefore:

Battle Hill

Benton

Camperdown

Chirton

Collingwood

Cullercoats

Howdon

Killingworth

Longbenton

Monkseaton North

Monkseaton South

Northumberland

Preston

Riverside

St Mary's

Tynemouth

Valley

Wallsend

A further by-election was held in November 2012. Details can be found here.

Weetslade

Whitley Bay

References

2012 English local elections
2012
21st century in Tyne and Wear